9R may refer to:

 AIM-9R, a cancelled version of the AIM-9 Sidewinder missile
 Kawasaki Ninja ZX-9R, a 1994 sport bike
 New York State Route 9R
 No. 9r, a 1916 British rigid airship
 Phuket Air IATA airline designator

See also
R9 (disambiguation)